Babushkinsky District is the name of several administrative and municipal districts in Russia.
Babushkinsky District, Moscow, a district in North-Eastern Administrative Okrug of Moscow
Babushkinsky District, Vologda Oblast, an administrative and municipal district of Vologda Oblast

See also
Babushkinsky (disambiguation)

References